Waianae Range (sometimes referred to as the Waianae Mountains) is the eroded remains of an ancient shield volcano that comprises the western half of the Hawaiian Island of Oahu.

Like the neighboring Koolau, the Waianae Range is not a mountain range in the sense most people are familiar with, as the mountain range as a whole was created from a single volcano rather than plate tectonics.

The oldest lava dated from the volcano are about 3.9 million years old. About 3.2 million years ago, the volcano's activity changed, the rate of eruption started to decrease and the composition of the lava erupted from the volcano changed. The volcano is thought to have last erupted about 2.5 million years ago.

When active, the Waianae volcano's center of activity was at present-day Lualualei Valley. Intense erosion on the western flank of the mountain has destroyed much of those flanks. Thus, the mountain today is much smaller than it was when the volcano was active.

While the western part of the mountain has been destroyed by erosion, the eastern part is still in a youthful stage of erosion. This is considered somewhat strange by some geologists since the western part of the volcano is on the leeward side of the island; thus, most rain falls on the eastern side of the volcano. Given this information, more erosion would be expected on the eastern portion of the mountain. One theory to explain this erosion pattern is that a large landslide cut away the western portion of the volcano. The faults from this huge landslide weakened the rock, making the western part of the mountain much more susceptible to erosion than the eastern side.

References

External links

 
Volcanoes of Oahu
Extinct volcanoes
Mountains of Hawaii
Landforms of Oahu
Polygenetic shield volcanoes
Hawaiian–Emperor seamount chain
Pliocene shield volcanoes
Pleistocene shield volcanoes
Neogene Oceania
Cenozoic Hawaii